Héctor Nemesio Esquiliano Solís (born 31 October 1951) is a Mexican politician from the Institutional Revolutionary Party. While studying as a medical surgeon at the National Autonomous University of Mexico, Esquiliano served as a Deputy of the XLIX Legislature of the Mexican Congress representing Quintana Roo. From 1999 to 2000 he served as a president of the Congress of Quintana Roo. He returned to the national congress during the LVIII Legislature.

References

1951 births
Living people
Politicians from Quintana Roo
People from Chetumal, Quintana Roo
Members of the Chamber of Deputies (Mexico)
Institutional Revolutionary Party politicians
21st-century Mexican politicians
National Autonomous University of Mexico alumni
20th-century Mexican politicians
Members of the Congress of Quintana Roo
20th-century Mexican people